The 2012 EmblemHealth Bronx Open was a professional tennis tournament played on hard courts. It was the seventeenth edition of the tournament which was part of the 2012 ITF Women's Circuit. It took place in Crotona Park East, Bronx, United States between 6 and 12 August 2012.

WTA entrants

Seeds

 1 Rankings are as of August 6, 2012.

Other entrants
The following players received wildcards into the singles main draw:
  Jacqueline Cako
  Julia Elbaba
  Eva Raszkiewicz

The following players received entry by a special ranking:
  Lauren Albanese

The following players received entry from the qualifying draw:
  Jan Abaza
  Eri Hozumi
  Emily Webley-Smith
  Allie Will

Champions

Singles

 Romina Oprandi def.  Anna Chakvetadze, 5–7, 6–3, 6–3

Doubles

 Shuko Aoyama /  Erika Sema def.  Eri Hozumi /  Miki Miyamura, 6–4, 7–6(7–4)

External links
Official Website
ITF Site

EmblemHealth Bronx Open
EmblemHealth Bronx Open
EmblemHealth Bronx Open
2010s in the Bronx
EmblemHealth Bronx Open
Hard court tennis tournaments in the United States
Sports competitions in New York City
Sports in the Bronx
Tennis tournaments in New York City